Atheradas of Laconia was an ancient Greek athlete listed by Eusebius of Caesarea as a victor in the stadion race of the 20th Olympiad (700 BC). After Pythagoras of Laconia he was the second Spartan to win the stadion, starting a strait of twenty Lacedaemonian titles in 150 years.

References

See also 
 Olympic winners of the Stadion race

Ancient Olympic competitors
8th-century BC Spartans
Ancient Spartan athletes